Ramón Eguiazábal Berroa (14 April 1896 – 1939) was a Spanish association football player who competed in the 1920 Summer Olympics. He was born in Irun. He was a member of the Spanish team, which won the silver medal in the football tournament.

References

External links
 
 
 

1896 births
1939 deaths
Spanish footballers
Spain international footballers
Footballers at the 1920 Summer Olympics
Olympic footballers of Spain
Olympic silver medalists for Spain
RCD Espanyol footballers
Footballers from the Basque Country (autonomous community)
Sportspeople from Irun
Olympic medalists in football
Medalists at the 1920 Summer Olympics
Association football midfielders
Basque Country international footballers